Julia – Eine ungewöhnliche Frau ("Julia: An Unusual Woman") is a German television series.

See also
List of German television series

External links
 

1998 Austrian television series debuts
2002 Austrian television series endings
1998 German television series debuts
2002 German television series endings
1990s Austrian television series
2000s Austrian television series
Television shows set in Austria
German-language television shows
Das Erste original programming
German legal television series